Milan is a village in Rock Island County, Illinois, United States. The population was 5,099 at the 2010 census.

The village is located near the Quad Cities of Illinois and Iowa.

History
The village is on the Rock River in northwest Illinois, about 4 miles upstream of its outlet to the Mississippi. The village is the site of the south campsites which comprised the Sauk and Fox village of Saukenuk, once the second-largest Native American inhabitation in North America.

Originally platted along the right-of-way for the Hennepin Canal, in 1837, the village site was called in land speculation papers "Hampton" (not the town in Illinois, approximately 13 miles north-northeast, on the Mississippi River—see Hampton, Illinois for more). "Hampton's" land speculators, George Camden and Franklin Vandruff, sold land along the Rock River, along a north-west flowing creek, which was re-routed north into the Rock's main channel. Along Mill Creek, the industries of wool-carding and (river clamshell) "pearl" button-making helped rename the village by 1841 as Camden Mills. 
 
The village has "sister cities" in Missouri, Tennessee, and Michigan.

Geography
Milan is located at  (41.446333, -90.565487).

Demographics

As of the census of 2000, there were 5,348 people, 2,310 households, and 1,457 families residing in the village. The racial makeup of the village was 92.46% White, 4.32% African American, 0.22% Native American, 0.45% Asian, 0.04% Pacific Islander, 1.08% from other races, and 1.42% from two or more races. Hispanic or Latino of any race were 2.92% of the population.

There were 2,310 households, out of which 28.5% had children under the age of 18 living with them, 45.7% were married couples living together, 13.3% had a female householder with no husband present, and 36.9% were non-families. 31.1% of all households were made up of individuals, and 13.5% had someone living alone who was 65 years of age or older. The average household size was 2.31 and the average family size was 2.88.

In the village, the population was spread out, with 23.3% under the age of 18, 9.6% from 18 to 24, 27.5% from 25 to 44, 24.7% from 45 to 64, and 14.9% who were 65 years of age or older. The median age was 38 years. For every 100 females, there were 93.5 males. For every 100 females age 18 and over, there were 89.2 males.

The median income for a household in the village was $34,556, and the median income for a family was $43,802. Males had a median income of $31,875 versus $22,747 for females. The per capita income for the village was $17,608. About 6.2% of families and 10.7% of the population were below the poverty line, including 13.9% of those under age 18 and 8.6% of those age 65 or over.

Economy
Milan is home to the John Deere North American Parts Distribution Center, one of the largest warehouses in the world.

Before ceasing operations in 2003, Eagle Food Centers was based out of Milan.

Notable people
 Ken Bowman, pro football center, winner of three NFL championships with Green Bay Packers, was born in Milan.
 Ethan Happ, Wisconsin Badgers basketball player
 Ralph Fletcher Seymour, book publisher, artist, author
 Joe Frisco, jazz dancer, vaudevillian and comic
 Therese Anne Fowler, author, television producer

References

External links
Official Website

 
Villages in Illinois
Cities in the Quad Cities
Populated places established in 1837